The suborder Lari is the part of the order Charadriiformes that includes the gulls, terns, skuas and skimmers; the rest of the order is made up of the waders and snipes. The auks are now placed into the Lari too, following recent research.
 Sometimes, the buttonquails are also placed here, but the molecular data and fossil record rather suggests they are a quite basal offshoot along with the snipe-like and aberrant waders.

The larids are generally larger species that take fish from the sea. Several gulls and skuas will also take food items from beaches, or rob smaller species, and some have become adapted to inland environments.

The suborder Lari includes six families:
 Family Turnicidae – buttonquails (18 species) 
 Family Dromadidae – crab-plover 
 Family Glareolidae – coursers, pratincoles (17 species) 
 Family Laridae – gulls, terns, skimmers (103 species) 
 Family Stercorariidae – skuas (7 species)
 Family Alcidae – auks (25 species)

References

Sources
 
 
 

 
Bird suborders
Extant Eocene first appearances
Taxa named by Richard Bowdler Sharpe